Forever by Your Side may refer to:

 "Forever by Your Side" (song), a 1983 song by The Manhattans
 Forever by Your Side (album), a 1983 album by The Manhattans